Wade Deacon High School is a coeducational secondary school  with academy status, located in Widnes, Cheshire, England.

Admissions
Wade Deacon has a Public Admissions Number of 300 per year and is oversubscribed. It is situated on Birchfield Road (B5419) between the districts of Farnworth (to the north) and Appleton (to the south) and opposite Victoria Park. Widnes railway station is just north of the school, and Widnes Golf Club is next door to the west. It is in the parish of St John, Widnes.

History

Grammar school
It was formerly two grammar schools - Wade Deacon Grammar School for Boys and Wade Deacon Grammar School for Girls. The school was named after Sir Henry Wade-Deacon CBE, Chairman of Lancashire County Council for four years until January 1931, and was one of seven sons of Henry Deacon, an important local industrialist of the United Alkali Company (now Ineos) and friend of Michael Faraday. He died on 29 July 1932 aged 79, being born on 18 October 1852. He left a will of around £75,000.

It was designed by Stephen Wilkinson, the architect of Lancashire County Council. It had room for 550 boys and girls. The grand-designed building was made of Ravenhead and multi-coloured rustic bricks with stone dressings. The floors of the main entrance were made marble terrazzo. The main drive from Birchfield Road was finished with Carnforth gravel. The building included two hard tennis courts. The school separated into separate gender schools in September 1947, next door to each other, with 400 in the boys' school and 450 in the girls' school. It was administered by the Widnes Committee for Education, part of Lancashire Education Committee, based on Lugsdale Road, and later in the 1960s known as the Widnes Excepted District. The girls' school had 700 girls in 1953, 500 in 1958, and 600 from 1967-74. The boys' school had 450 boys in 1953, 600 in 1960, and 700 from 1964-74. Rugby was an important sport at the boys' school.

In April 1974, it came under the jurisdiction of Cheshire Education Committee.

Comprehensive
It became the Wade Deacon High School in September 1974 for ages 11–16. The headmaster, Mr Ernest High Smith, came directly from the Kingsway County Secondary School, a secondary modern school on Kingsway, which formed the comprehensive with both grammar schools. He left in December 1978. A levels would be taken at Widnes VI Form College or Halton FE College. In April 1998, it was administered by Halton borough.

Academy
The school converted to academy status on 1 March 2013.

Notable former pupils

 Alan Bleasdale, playwright (1957-1964)
 James Durbin, Professor of Statistics from 1961-1988 at the London School of Economics, and President from 1986-7 of the Royal Statistical Society and from 1983-5 of the International Statistical Institute, and who invented the Durbin test (1934–41)
 Fred Lawless, writer and producer for Brookside
 Gordon Oakes, local Labour MP for Halton from 1983–97 and for Widnes from 1971–83
 Steve Platt, journalist
 Sir Ken Robinson, author (1963-1968)
 Stephen Myler, professional rugby union player, Northampton Saints and England
 Rachel McDowall, film actress

References

 Guardian 2 October 1930, page 4

Secondary schools in the Borough of Halton
Widnes
Educational institutions established in 1931
Academies in the Borough of Halton
1931 establishments in England